The Pas/Grace Lake Water Aerodrome, formerly , was located adjacent to The Pas, Manitoba, Canada.

See also
The Pas Airport
The Pas/Grace Lake Airport

References

Defunct seaplane bases in Manitoba

Transport in The Pas